The following is a list of notable deaths in August 2004.

Entries for each day are listed alphabetically by surname. A typical entry lists information in the following sequence:
 Name, age, country of citizenship at birth, subsequent country of citizenship (if applicable), reason for notability, cause of death (if known), and reference.

August 2004

1
Philip Hauge Abelson, 91, American physicist, co-discoverer of Neptunium.
Vivian Austin, 84, American actress.
John Higgins, 88, American swimmer and coach, pneumonia.
George F. Kugler Jr., 79, American lawyer.
Viktor Malyuk, 43, Russian serial killer, suicide by hanging.
Sidney Morgenbesser, 82, American philosopher.
Albrecht Obermaier, 92, German naval officer.
Laurence Stark, 83, Royal Air Force pilot and WWII flying ace.
Ken Timbs, 53, American professional wrestler, cardiomyopathy and congestive heart failure.

2
Akwasi Ampofo Adjei, 47, Ghanaian highlife musician.
Heinrich Mark, 92, Estonian politician, Prime Minister-in-exile (1971–1990).
José Omar Pastoriza, 62, Argentinian football player. and coach.
Mike Schultz, 83, American baseball player (Cincinnati Reds).
Arturo Tolentino, 93, Philippine lawyer and politician.

3
Henri Cartier-Bresson, 95, French photographer.
Gloria Emerson, 75, American author, journalist and New York Times war correspondent, suicide.
Brian Hitch, 72, British diplomat.
Bob Murphy, 79, American MLB New York Mets announcer.
Bryon Nickoloff, 48, Canadian chess International Master, represented Canada in six Chess Olympiads.
Geraldine Peroni, 51, American film editor (The Player, Dr. T and the Women, Michael), suicide.

4
Mary Dees, 93, American actress.
Jeanne Gilchrist, 78, American baseball player (AAGPBL).
Hunter Hancock, 88, American R&B and rock DJ.
Sir Robert Jennings, 90, British jurist, President of the International Court of Justice.
Joseph Bearwalker Wilson, 62, American shaman and witch.

5
Jim Alford, 90, British athlete.
Don Grossman, 83, Australian rules footballer.
James Hubbard, 74, American convicted murderer, executed by lethal injection in Alabama.
Edith Jiménez, 86, Paraguayan plastic artist.

6
Lien Ying Chow, 98, Singaporean businessperson, pneumonia.
Santosh Gupta, 79, Bangladeshi journalist and writer.
Rick James, 56, American singer ("Mary Jane", "Give It to Me Baby", "Super Freak") and producer, heart attack.
Donald Justice, 78, American poet.
Murray S. Klamkin, 83, American mathematician.
Natteri Veeraraghavan, 90, Indian physician, microbiologist and medical researcher.

7
Paul "Red" Adair, 89, American oil well fire-fighter.
Concepcion Anes, 79, Gibraltarian politician, MHA.
Colin Bibby, 55, English ornithologist.
Bernard Levin, 75, English journalist and broadcaster.
Gordon Smith, 80, Scottish footballer.

8
Robert "Gypsy Boots" Bootzin, 89, American health and fitness pioneer.
Nigel Capel-Cure, 95, British cricketer and landowner.
Pete Center, 92, American baseball player (Cleveland Indians).
Paul "Mousie" Garner, 95, American comedian, Three Stooges associate.
Leon Golub, 82, American artist and painter.
Charles L. Lewis, 37, American politician.
Dimitris Papamichael, 70, Greek actor.
Jean Pouliot, 81, Canadian broadcasting pioneer, helped establish television stations in Kitchener, Ontario and Quebec City, Quebec.
Richard Taylor, 23, Welsh skating and skiing champion, collided with a concrete lamp-post.
Fay Wray, 96, Canadian-born American actress (King Kong).

9
Liisi Beckmann, 79, Finnish designer and artist.
Edwin Michael Conway, 70, American Bishop of the Roman Catholic Church, esophageal cancer
Tony Mottola, 86, American guitarist who played with Frank Sinatra and on The Tonight Show orchestra.
Eduard Neumann, 93, German Luftwaffe officer during WWII.
David Raksin, 92, American composer of film and television scores (Laura), two Academy Award nominations (Forever Amber, Separate Tables).
Sir David Steel, 87, British businessman.

10
Walter Bielser, 75, Swiss footballer.
James Stillman Rockefeller, 102, American member of the Rockefeller family, oldest known U.S. Olympic medal winner.
Alan N. Cohen, 73, American owner of the Boston Celtics.

11
Bjarne Andersson, 64, Swedish cross-county skier, Olympic silver medallist (1968).
Sir David Calcutt, 73, British barrister and public servant.
Chen Chunxian, 70, Chinese physicist, founder of Zhongguancun.
Keith Drinan, 79, Australian rules footballer, (St Kilda).
Joe Falls, 76, American journalist, longtime sports writer for The Detroit News.
Bill Martin, Jr., 88, American author of Chicka Chicka Boom Boom.
Wolfgang Mommsen, 73, German historian.

12
Sir Godfrey Hounsfield, 84, British Nobel Prize in Medicine, co-inventor of the CAT scan.
Ian Lake, 69, British musician.
Robert L. Morris, 62, American parapsychologist.
Sebastián Ontoria, 84, Spanish footballer.
George Yardley, 75, American National Basketball Association Hall of Famer.

13
Julia Child, 91, American chef, author and television hostess on French cuisine.
Stefan Dimitrov, 64, Bulgarian opera basso singer.
Milton Pollack, 97, U.S. federal judge who ruled on court cases involving Wall Street.
Ondřej Voříšek, 18, Czech football, car accident.
Peter Woodthorpe, 72, British character actor.

14
Dhananjoy Chatterjee, 39, Indian rapist and murderer, the first person executed in India since 1995.
William D. Ford, 77, American politician, member of the United States House of Representatives from Michigan from 1965 to 1995.
Neal Fredericks, 35, American cinematographer (The Blair Witch Project), drowned.
Robert Howard, 28, American athlete.
Czesław Miłosz, 93, Polish poet, Nobel Prize in Literature in 1980, and dissident.
Bomber Moran, 59, Filipino actor.
Eric Petrie, 77, New Zealand cricketer.
Stephen M. Reasoner, 60, American judge (United States district judge of the United States District Court for the Eastern District of Arkansas).
Sir Trevor Skeet, 86, New Zealand-born British lawyer and politician.

15
Semiha Berksoy, 94, Turkish opera singer.
Sune K. Bergström, 88, Swedish biochemist, Nobel Prize in Medicine.
Pedro Grases, 94, Venezuelan writer.
Marian Kozłowski, 76, Polish basketball administrator.
Bent Ole Retvig, 68, Danish cyclist.
John Richardson, Baron Richardson, 94, British physician.
Ollie Silva, 75, American auto racing driver.

16
Acquanetta, 83, American-born "Venezuelan" B-movie actress.
Mick Clingly, 72, Australian sportsman.
H. G. Davis Jr., 80, Australian journalist and educator.
Ivan Hlinka, 54, Czech national hockey team and Pittsburgh Penguins coach.
J. Irwin Miller, 95,  American businessman, philanthropist, and civil rights advocate.
George Moe, 72, Barbadian politician and former Chief Justice of Belize.
Carl Mydans, 97, American photographer.
Robert Quiroga, 35, American world champion boxer, murdered.
Stephen Terrell, 88, British barrister and politician, President of the Liberal Party.
Sam Wildman, 92, American biologist.

17
Thea Astley, 78, Australian novelist.
Sheila Callender, 90, British physician and haematologist.
Anatoly Guzhvin, 58, Russian politician and head of the administration of Astrakhan Oblast.
Dennis "D-Roc" Miles, 45, American rhythm guitarist for Body Count, from lymphoma complications.
Gérard Souzay, 85, French baritone.

18
Susan Mary Alsop, 84, American socialite, hostess and writer.
Elmer Bernstein, 82, American film composer (Thoroughly Modern Millie, Ghostbusters, To Kill a Mockingbird), Oscar winner (1968), cancer.
Hiram Fong, 97, American businessman and politician, first Asian American elected to the U.S. Senate.
Hugh Manning, 83, British actor (Emmerdale, The Elephant Man, Mrs Thursday).
Víctor Cervera Pacheco, 68, Mexican politician, former Governor of Yucatán.
Ray Reutt, 87, American professional football player (Virginia Military Institute, Phil/Pit Steagles).
Charlie Waller, 69, American bluegrass musician, founder of the band Country Gentlemen.

19
Tom Baldwin, 57, American race driver, racing accident.
George Gibson, 98, American football player and coach.
Martin Knottenbelt, 84, Dutch anti-war activist.
Kyi Maung, 83, Myanmar Army officer and politician.
Rudolf Miele, 74, German entrepreneur.
Peggy Peterman, American journalist and columnist.
Jack Pinder, 91, English footballer.
Günter Rexrodt, 62, German politician, former Economics Minister of Germany.

20
William J. Firey, 81, American mathematician.
Arthur Lever, 84, Welsh professional footballer.
María Antonieta Pons, 82, Cuban-born star of rumbera films.
Moshe Shamir, 83, Israeli politician and novelist.
Leslie Shepard, 87, British author, archivist, and curator.

21
Viktor Avilov, 51, Soviet and Russian film and theater actor, cancer.
Amelia Batistich, 89, New Zealand fiction writer.
Hortensia Blanch Pita, 89, Spanish writer.
Maddy English, 79, American baseball player (AAGPBL)
Sachidananda Routray, 88, Indian poet and novelist.
Moshe Shamir, 82, Israeli author, playwright and columnist.
Clip Smith, 63, American media personality.

22
Konstantin Aseev, 43, Russian chess Grandmaster and coach.
Louella Daetweiler, 86, American baseball player (AAGPBL)
Al Dvorin, 81, American bandleader and talent agent, automobile accident.
Marcel Caux, 105, Australian First World War veteran, last known survivor of the Battle of Pozières.
George Kirgo, 78, American television and film writer, former president of the Writers Guild of America.
Jim Nelson, 57, American baseball player (Pittsburgh Pirates).
Daniel Petrie, 83, Canadian film director (A Raisin in the Sun, Cocoon: The Return, The Bay Boy).
Reginaldo Polloni, 87–88, Italian Olympic rower (men's coxed four rowing at the 1948 Summer Olympics).
Ota Sik, 84, Czech economist and politician, architect of economic liberalization during Czechoslovakia's ill-fated 1968 Prague Spring.

23
Povilas Aksomaitis, 66, Lithuanian politician and engineer.
Hank Borowy, 88, American baseball player, former New York Yankees, Chicago Cubs, Philadelphia Phillies, Pittsburgh Pirates and Detroit Tigers pitcher.
Mary Guiney, 103, Irish businesswoman; chairperson of the Clerys department store.
Francesco Minerva, 100, Italian Roman Catholic archbishop.

24
Richard Ervin, 99, American attorney general and chief justice of Florida.
Elisabeth Kübler-Ross, 78, Swiss-born psychiatrist.
Eleni Ioannou, 20, Greek judoka.
Carlos Lacoste, 75, Argentinian naval officer and interim President.
Bob Price, 76, American politician (U.S. Representative for Texas's 18th congressional district and Texas's 13th congressional district).
William Siri, 85, American biophysics researcher at Lawrence Berkeley National Laboratory, mountaineer and environmentalist.

25
Don Ashton, 85, British film art director and production designer.
Roger Broughton, 45, New Zealand cricketer.
Hal Epps, 90, American baseball player (St. Louis Cardinals, St. Louis Browns, Philadelphia Athletics).
Marcelo Gonzalez Martin, 86, Spanish Roman Catholic primate of Spain, Cardinal (since 1973) and Archbishop of Toledo (1971-1995).

26
Enzo G. Baldoni, 56, Italian journalist, murdered in Iraq.
Laura Branigan, 52, American pop singer ("Gloria", "Self Control"), cerebral aneurysm.
Lewis Carter-Jones, 83, British politician.
Lloyd Smith, 74, Australian cricketer.

27
Fernand Auberjonois, 93, Swiss foreign news correspondent for the Pittsburgh Post-Gazette and Toledo Blade; father of actor René Auberjonois.
Willie Crawford, 57, American former outfielder for the Los Angeles Dodgers.
Gottlieb Göller, 69, German football player and manager.
Suzanne Kaaren, 92, American actress (Three Stooges films).
Liang Su-yung, 84, Taiwanese politician, President of the Legislative Yuan.
Larry McCormick, 71, American television personality.
Susan Peretz, 64, American actress (Dog Day Afternoon, Melvin and Howard, Swing Shift, Oh, God! You Devil), breast cancer.
William Pierson, 78, American actor (Stalag 17, Three's Company, Corvette Summer).

28
Jerzy Dzięcioł, 92, Polish Olympic sailor 
Silvana Jachino, 88, Italian actress.
Robert Lewin, 84, American producer and screenwriter, lung cancer.
José Puyet, 82, Spanish painter

29
Donald Allen, 92, American editor, publisher and translator of American literature.
Lee Guttero, 91, American basketball player.
Ivar Aavatsmark, 91, Norwegian corporate executive and forester, director of Norwegian Forest Owners Association (1942-1982).
Helen Lane, 83, American translator.
John Francis Nash, 94, American railroad executive.

30
Larry Desmedt, 55, American motorcycle designer, injuries suffered during a stunt.
Willie Duff, 69, Scottish football goalkeeper (Heart of Midlothian, Charlton Athletic, Peterborough United and Dunfermline Athletic).
Derek Johnson, 71, British athlete and athletics administrator.
Fay Jones, 83, American architect and designer, trained by Frank Lloyd Wright.
Bob Sherman, 63, American actor.
Fred Lawrence Whipple, 97, American astronomer.

31
Joe Barry, 65, American Swamp Pop singer of "I'm a Fool to Care".
Lex Peterson, 46, New Zealand Olympic bobsledder (two-man and four-man bobsled at the 1988 Winter Olympics).
Carl Wayne, 61, English lead singer of pop group The Move, cancer.

References

2004-08
08